José Manuel Albares Bueno (born 22 March 1972) is a Spanish diplomat who has been serving as Minister of Foreign Affairs, European Union and Cooperation in the government of Prime Minister Pedro Sánchez since 2021.

Early life and education 
Born in 1972 in Madrid, he was raised in a humble family from Usera. Albares earned a licentiate degree in Law from the University of Deusto and also a diploma in Business Sciences.

Career in the diplomatic service 
As he joined the diplomatic career, Albares served as consul in Bogotá, as well as advisor in the Permanent Representation of Spain before the OECD.

Key advisor of PSOE's Pedro Sánchez during the latter's first spell as party leader, Sánchez appointed Albares to a post in the Prime Minister Cabinet Office, once he became Prime Minister in June 2018: Secretary General of International Affairs, European Union, G20 and Global Security, with rank of Under-Secretary. Albares, who left then a post as cultural attaché in the Spanish embassy in Paris, was sworn in on 21 June. Affiliated to the PSOE's grouping in Paris, he was chosen as one of the drafters of the framework presentation for the party's 40th federal congress.

Albares was appointed as Ambassador to France in February 2020 and to Monaco in May 2020.

Minister of Foreign Affairs 
In July 2021, Albares was revealed as Sánchez' pick as Minister of Foreign Affairs, European Union and Cooperation in a cabinet reshuffle. He was sworn on into office on 12 July 2021.

During his first days as head of the Foreign Department, Albares managed to reduce tensions with Morocco and rebuild relations after Spain allowed, for humanitarian reasons, the Saharawi leader, Brahim Ghali, to be treated in a hospital in Logroño. Proof of this were the declarations of King Mohammed VI of Morocco, who assured in August 2021 that he wanted to "inaugurate an unprecedented stage" in relations between the two countries.

Albares addressed the Foreign Affairs Committee of the Congress of Deputies for the first time on 30 August 2021, to give an account of his first decisions as head of the Foreign Ministry, the general lines that he would develop and the 2021 Afghanistan crisis. In his appearance, he revealed that on 15 July 2021 his Department, through the Embassy in Afghanistan, warned and recommended the Spanish nationals in the country to leave it. This allowed that, when the Afghan crisis broke out, only five Spanish nationals remained, in addition to diplomatic and security personnel. He also announced that the government had no intention of recognizing the new Taliban government and that they would continue to remove people from Afghanistan by other means. In October 2021, in a joint operation with the Ministry of Defence, the government evacuated via Pakistan more than 240 collaborators and their families.

As for general policy, Albares demanded that the opposition treat foreign policy as a "state policy", and regarding the restructuring that he carried out in the Ministry as soon as he took office, he affirmed that one of his objectives was to strengthen the policy on North Africa, the Sahel and Latin America, highlighting about the latter that he considers "all Ibero-American countries equally important, regardless of their size or economic weight".

Another issue that he had to deal with as head of the Foreign Ministry was to guarantee the permanence in Spain of the World Tourism Organization (UNWTO). For a few months, it had been rumored that Saudi Arabia planned to make a proposal to move the headquarters to his country and that the then Secretary-General, Zurab Pololikashvili, wouldn't oppose it. Despite being only rumors and the silence of the Secretary-General in this regard, the government, headed Albares, carried out a diplomatic offensive consisting of fulfilling the existing promise to give the UNWTO a new headquarters and a series of consultations with ambassadors from different countries, which allowed Spain to guarantee a blocking minority with European and Latin American countries in the event of the Saudi proposal. Finally, Saudi Arabia informed the Government of Spain that it would not present any candidacy.

In relation to the 2021–2022 Russo-Ukrainian crisis, he declared in January that the Spanish government was committed to dialogue as a distinguishing feature of European foreign policy but that "it had to be very clear [with Russia], dialogue it is not negotiation. We cannot accept things that are unacceptable", and said "no one can mark who can be a member of an international organization and who cannot", in relation to the possible accession of Ukraine to NATO or the European Union. Following the Bucha massacre in April 2022, Albares expelled some 25 Russian diplomats and embassy staff from Madrid, joining other European Union countries in its response to alleged war crimes by Russian troops in Ukraine.

Other activities
 Elcano Royal Institute for International and Strategic Studies, Member of the Board of Trustees

References 

Spanish diplomats
1972 births
Living people
Ambassadors of Spain to France
Foreign ministers of Spain
People from Madrid